Roxbury is a community on the Rockaway Peninsula in the New York City borough of Queens originally settled by Irish immigrants in the early 20th century. The neighborhood is just west of the Marine Parkway–Gil Hodges Memorial Bridge and adjoins Fort Tilden. It is an inholding within the borders of the Breezy Point Unit of Gateway National Recreation Area, of the National Park System. The area was severely affected by Hurricane Sandy in 2012.

Roxbury is part of the Breezy Point Cooperative, a private property owning corporation of residents. Of the roughly 2,000 homes in the cooperative, Roxbury makes up around 400 of them. Specific parking stickers are required to park in the community.

Roxbury, like other parts of the Rockaway Peninsula, has a significantly larger proportion of white residents compared to other parts of Queens.

References

Neighborhoods in Rockaway, Queens
Condominiums and housing cooperatives in Queens, New York
Populated coastal places in New York (state)
Beaches of Queens, New York